Affonso de Azevedo Évora, also commonly as Fon-Fon (August 29, 1918 – August 2, 2008), was a Brazilian basketball player who competed in the 1948 Summer Olympics. There he won the bronze medal with the national team under the guidance of head coach Moacyr Daiuto.

References

External links
Profile
 Profile

1918 births
2008 deaths
Brazilian men's basketball players
Olympic basketball players of Brazil
Basketball players at the 1948 Summer Olympics
Flamengo basketball players
Olympic bronze medalists for Brazil
Place of birth missing
Olympic medalists in basketball
Medalists at the 1948 Summer Olympics
Basketball players from Rio de Janeiro (city)